Cursing may refer to:

 Curse, an evil wish or spell
 Profanity, offensive language